Trip is a free clinical search engine.  Its primary function is to help clinicians identify the best available evidence with which to answer clinical questions.  Its roots are firmly in the world of evidence-based medicine.

History
The site was created in 1997 as a search tool to help the staff of ATTRACT answer clinical questions for GPs in Gwent, South Wales.  Shortly afterwards Bandolier highlighted the Trip Database and this helped establish the site.  In 2003, after a period of steady growth, Trip became a subscription-only service.  This was abandoned In September 2006 and since then the growth in usage has been significant. Originally "Trip" stood for Turning Research Into Practice, but the system is now simply called Trip.

Process
The core to Trip’s system is the identification and incorporation of new evidence.  The people behind Trip are heavily involved in clinical question answering systems (e.g., NLH Q&A Service).  Therefore, if resources are identified that are useful in the Q&A process they tend to be added to Trip.

Users
A site survey (September 2007) showed that the site was searched over 500,000 times per month, with 69% from health professionals and 31% from members of the public. Of the health professionals around 43% are doctors.  Most users come from either the United Kingdom or the United States.  In September 2008 the site was searched 1.4 million times. To date the site has been searched over 100 million times.

Recent updates
At the end of 2012 Trip had a major upgrade which saw significant new enhancements:

 New content - widening the coverage
 New design
 Advanced search
 PICO search - to help users formulate focused searches
 Improved filtering
 Search history/timeline - recording all a user activity on the site
 Related articles

Education tracker
Trip has an education tracker which allows users to record their activity on Trip which can then be used, subject to local regulations, for revalidation/re-licensing.

Future areas of work
Trip is exploring numerous innovative technologies to improve the site, these include:
 Link out to full-text articles via Trip.
 RCT database.
 Rapid (within a week) systematic review quality reviews.
 Learning from users prior use of the site and that of similar users to improve search results.

Trip Answers
In November 2008, Trip released a new website, Trip Answers.  This is a repository of clinical Q&As from a variety of Q&A services. At launch it had over 5,000 Q&As and currently has over 6,300.  This content has been integrated into Trip.

References

External links
 Trip
 Using the Turning Research Into Practice (TRIP) database: how do clinicians really search? an evaluation of the website.
 Reviews: From Systematic to Narrative review of the site
 Evidence Based Pyramid a pictorial representation of TRIP's approach to the evidence

British medical websites
Information retrieval systems